The Cyprus Rugby League Federation (CRLF)  is a men's rugby league in the Larnaca region of Cyprus.  It was established in October 2011.

References

Rugby league governing bodies in Europe
Rugby League
Sports organizations established in 2011